Northern Border Pipeline is a natural gas pipeline which brings gas from Canada through Montana, North Dakota, South Dakota, Minnesota, and Iowa into the Chicago area.  It is owned by TC PipeLines, LP and ONEOK Partners and is operated by TC PipeLines, LP .  Its FERC code is 89.

References

External links
Pipeline Electronic Bulletin Board

Natural gas pipelines in Canada
Natural gas pipelines in the United States
Canada–United States relations
TC Energy
Natural gas pipelines in Montana
Natural gas pipelines in North Dakota
Natural gas pipelines in South Dakota
Natural gas pipelines in Minnesota
Natural gas pipelines in Iowa
Natural gas pipelines in Illinois